State Road 598 (NM 598) was a  state highway in the US state of New Mexico. NM 598's western terminus was at NM 76 in Truchas, and the eastern terminus was at the end of route by Truchas.
The 2016 NMDOT Highway Log does not include a NM 598 designation in the list.

Major intersections

See also

References

598
Transportation in Rio Arriba County, New Mexico